Nahshon is a biblical character.

Nahshon or Nachshon may also refer to:

First name
Nahshon Even-Chaim (born 1971), Australian computer hacker
Nahshon Garrett, American wrestler
Nachshon Wachsman (1975–1994), Israeli soldier abducted and killed by Hamas
Nahshon Wright, American gridiron football player
Nahshon ben Zadok, 9th century Jewish scholar

Surname
Hilla Nachshon (born 1980), Israeli television host
Shuli Nachshon (born 1951), Israeli video and installation artist
Tamar Fish Nachshon (1926 – 2008), Israeli writer

Other
Nahshon, Israel, a kibbutz in central Israel
Nahshon Battalion, a unit of the Israel Defense Forces (regular unit)
Operation Nachshon, an Israel Defense Forces operation during the 1948 Arab-Israeli War